Marco Cassetti (born 29 May 1977) is an Italian former footballer who played as a defender.

Born in Brescia, he has previously played in Serie A for Verona, Lecce and Roma and in England with Watford. Cassetti won five caps for Italy at full international level. Principally a right-back, Cassetti started his career as a right midfielder. He has also played as a central defender.

Club career

Cassetti started his football career at Montichiari, an amateur-level club inside the province of Brescia. In his two seasons with them he made 30 appearances and scored six goals. He then moved on to a Serie C1 team, Lumezzane, where he also stayed for two years. His debut in the Serie A came with Hellas Verona F.C. in a 1–1 draw with Bari. He was often a sub in his first two years with them but became a starter the next year when they were relegated to the Serie B. After that he was a typical starter for Lecce, playing with them for three seasons.

In the 2006–07 season, Cassetti left Lecce to sign a four-year contract with Roma on a co-ownership deal for €1.5M due to Lecce's relegation. His teammate Mirko Vučinić also joined on loan for €3.25M. In June 2007, the remain registration rights of Cassetti were bought for €851,500.

In December 2009, he scored a winner against Lazio. On that day he became a hero for all Roma fans. On 3 June 2010, he signed a new 1-year deal with Roma and his pre-tax salary was increased to €1.8M from €1.34M. His contract was renewed again in March 2011.

He then became a second choice as a right back, with Aleandro Rosi being favoured over him. He played two games against Slovan Bratislava, but he disappointed with his performance. He played only 5 matches in the first part of the 2011–12 season due to his injury, Towards the end of the season Cassetti stated that he experienced less playing time due to manager Luis Enrique considering him as more of a centre-back rather than a right back.

At the end of the 2011–12 season it became clear that Roma decided against offering Cassetti a contract extension, meaning that he would leave the capital club at the end of the season.

On 23 August 2012, Cassetti signed for Udinese on a one-year deal, agreeing to join Watford on a season-long loan on the same day. Udinese did not publicise their signing of Cassetti, meaning that it was a move purely for the benefit of the English Championship club.
In June 2013, Cassetti signed for Watford permanently and scored his first goal for the club in a 3–3 draw at home to Blackburn Rovers on 25 March 2014.

After two years at Vicarage Road, Cassetti announced he would be leaving Watford upon the expiry of his contract in May 2014. Roma manager Rudi Garcia had allowed Cassetti to train with the club in September, and in January 2015, Cassetti agreed a deal to join Lega Pro side Como.

International career
Cassetti has been capped for the Italian national team five times at senior level. He was the first Lecce player ever to play for the national team when he earned his first cap in 2005. He played his last game for Italy in a 2008 2–1 over Cyprus in 2010 FIFA World Cup qualification, under Marcello Lippi.

Honours
Roma
Coppa Italia (2): 2006–07, 2007–08; Runner-up: 2009–10
Supercoppa Italiana: 2007; Runner-up: 2006, 2008, 2010
Serie A Runner-up: 2006–07, 2007–08, 2009–10

References

External links
 
 Full statistics  
 
 Profile at LegaSerieA.it 
 FIGC Profile  

1977 births
Living people
Italian footballers
Italian expatriate footballers
Italy international footballers
Association football defenders
A.C. Montichiari players
F.C. Lumezzane V.G.Z. A.S.D. players
Hellas Verona F.C. players
U.S. Lecce players
A.S. Roma players
Udinese Calcio players
Watford F.C. players
Como 1907 players
Serie A players
Serie B players
Serie C players
English Football League players
Expatriate footballers in England
Footballers from Brescia